The Château de la Johannie is an historic castle in Curemonte, Corrèze, Nouvelle-Aquitaine, France.

History
It was built circa 1308 on an old house built in 1083. It belonged to Hugues de Jean in the 14th century. It stayed in the Jean family (later known as the Johannie family) until 1498, when it was acquired by Jacques Vassal, who owned 1/7th of Curemonte.

It was acquired by Mathieu Brun in 1623, followed by the Dambert family. It was acquired by the Plas family in 1693.

Architectural significance
It has been listed as an official monument since 1981.

References

Castles in Nouvelle-Aquitaine
Monuments historiques of Nouvelle-Aquitaine